My Four Children is a 2002 documentary about an Israeli mother who takes in four foster children with Down syndrome after two of her own children were killed.

Summary
Both gentle and assertive, Nelly is an ideal mother. While most people would be overwhelmed by the responsibility of four children that are developmentally impaired and have special needs, Nelly isn't fazed. She treats them as if they were normal children. The documentary show how under her supervision, the children learn to play musical instruments,  use appropriate table manners, and feel loved.

Nelly's foster children came from cruel circumstances. Tom and Suzie, the first two children Nelly took in, were previously placed in a foster home where they were force fed so roughly that they would end up eating blood with their food. It them a long time to trust and feel comfortable in Nelly's gentle home.

The documentary explores what it means to be a mother, whether it's a matter of biology or behavior. Suzie's biological mother explains, quite honestly, that she loved her daughter when she was a baby, but as soon as Suzie started to grow older, and her disorder became evident, she felt incapable of caring for her. She still visits Suzie, now and then, but says that she considers Nelly Suzie's real mother.

What's initially surprising about Nelly's situation is the lack of support she receives from her immediate family. Her husband divorced her because he couldn't handle having four young children in the house again, and her eldest daughter doesn't support Nelly's decision to adopt one of the foster children. While their behavior seems harsh at first, as the documentary progresses, they become more sympathetic. Their lives were just as devastated by the family tragedies as Nelly's; and, perhaps, in some ways, Nelly abandoned her original family when she decided to take in new children.

Film Festivals
 Assim Vivemos Festival 2007, Brazil
 Sprout Film Festival 2004, New York
 Seattle Jewish Film Festival 2004
 DocAviv Film Festival 2002, Israel
 San Francisco Film Festival 2003
 Israeli Film Festival 2003, Hong Kong

See also
Other documentaries about unique Jewish families:
My Yiddish Momme McCoy
Balancing Acts
Divine Food

References

External links
The distributor's website
Aired and reviewed on The Jewish Channel

2002 films
Israeli documentary films
Documentary films about children with disability
Documentary films about adoption
2002 documentary films
Down syndrome in film